Kaserne is a loanword taken from the German word , which means "barracks". It is the typical term used when naming the garrison location for American and Canadian forces stationed in Germany. American forces were also sometimes housed in installations simply referred to as "barracks", such as Ray Barracks in Friedberg.

American forces within a kaserne could range in size anywhere from company size, with a few hundred troops and equipment, to brigade level formation with supporting units, or approximately three to five thousand troops and their equipment.  The largest single unit combat force in Germany, the First Brigade of the U.S. 3rd Armored Division was housed at Ayers Kaserne, Kirch-Göns, Germany, also known as "The Rock".  While several dozen kasernes with NATO forces were once spread across the American sector of Germany, after the end of the Cold War, many have since closed, and some have been demolished.

Most army posts within the United States house units and/or multiple units of a much larger size than one would find in a kaserne.  These installations are typically called "forts", such as Fort Knox, Fort Campbell, Fort Dix etc.  National Guard and Reserve installations, though sometimes designated as "forts", are more often referred to as "camps".

By contrast, British Forces in Germany used the term 'barracks' for locations containing one or a small number of units. For larger bases with several units, 'station' (e.g. Hohne Station) or 'complex' (e.g. Rheindahlen Military Complex) was used; 'garrison' referred to a number of barracks within the same general geographical area that formed the home for a formation such as a brigade.

See also 

Coleman Kaserne
Husterhoeh Kaserne

External links 
  
  
  
  

Military life
German words and phrases

de:Kaserne